Lucyfire is a musical project of Johan Edlund, the main member and vocalist of the band Tiamat. The original Tiamat band, as Edlund points out, will go on, and Lucyfire is the place for all the tracks that don't suit Tiamat.

Lucyfire's only album so far, This Dollar Saved My Life At Whitehorse, is contrary to Tiamat's style, being mostly straightforward rock music with lyrics about the frequently quoted subject matter of wine, women and song.

After releasing two new demo songs in early 2010 and looking to release their second album later in the year, Johan Edlund decided to disband Lucyfire for the foreseeable future.  One of the demo songs, titled "Thunder and Lightning", was included on the latest Tiamat album, The Scarred People.

Line-up
 Johan Edlund - vocals
 Dirk Draeger - guitars
 Mark Engelmann - keyboards
 Jan Kazda - bass guitar
 Bertram Engel - drums

Discography
 This Dollar Saved My Life At Whitehorse (2001)

External links
 Lucyfire's official website
 Lucyfire's official myspace.com page

German gothic rock groups